Jorge Luis Alcantar Bolly (born April 30, 1984), is a Mexican second-generation luchador (professional wrestler). He is currently signed to WWE, where he performs on the SmackDown brand under the ring name Santos Escobar.

Before his WWE career, Alcantar worked as El Hijo del Fantasma for Lucha Libre AAA Worldwide (AAA) from 2013 to 2019. In AAA, he won the AAA Fusión Championship, the AAA Latin American Championship, the 2017 Copa Antonio Peña, and was previously the longest-reigning AAA World Cruiserweight Champion in history. He previously worked for Consejo Mundial de Lucha Libre (CMLL) from 2008 to 2013. In CMLL, he held the CMLL World Middleweight Championship, as well as the CMLL World Trios Championship twice (with Héctor Garza and La Máscara).

Alcantar has also worked under the ring name King Cuerno for the U.S.-based Lucha Underground promotion from 2014 to 2019. Through AAA's promotional partnerships, Alcantar also worked on several shows for Impact Wrestling, while under AAA contract. His father is luchador El Fantasma, who is the head of the Mexico City Boxing and Professional Wrestling commission. His cousin wrestles under the name "Fantasma Jr.", while his uncle worked under the name "Ángel de la Muerte".

Professional wrestling career

Early career (2000–2008)
Alcantar began his professional wrestling career in 2000, as the masked ring character "Top Secret". While working under the Top Secret name he wore a black mask with gold trim around the eye openings. In 2003, Alcantar adopted a new mask and name as he became "El Hijo del Fantasma", revealing  to the wrestling world that he was the son of El Fantasma. After the name change he began wearing a mask that closely resembled that of the comic book character The Phantom, just like his father did before him.

His first documented match as El Hijo del Fantasma saw him team up with his father and his cousin, who adopted the ring name "Fantasma Jr.". They defeated Los Oficiales (Guardia, Oficial, and Vanguardia) at an International Wrestling Revolution Group (IWRG) show on December 14, 2003.

Consejo Mundial de Lucha Libre (2008–2013)
Alcantar was brought to Consejo Mundial de Lucha Libre (CMLL) in 2008, after he left IWRG in 2004. During his time in CMLL, he won the CMLL World Trios Championship on two occasions, teaming with Héctor Garza and La Mascara. The three were first teamed up to participate in a tournament for the vacant CMLL World Trios Championship. Despite never having teamed before, the trio made it all the way to the finals, and then defeated Blue Panther, Dos Caras Jr., and Místico in the finals to win the tournament and the championship. On August 5, 2008, they lost their title to Último Guerrero, Negro Casas, and Atlantis. They had a rematch where Garza, La Mascara, and Hijo del Fantasma regained their title on January 18, 2009. On July 21, 2009, Hijo del Fantasma defeated Averno to win the CMLL World Middleweight Championship. After the match, Averno showed respect to Fantasma by congralutating him and celebrating the victory. On February 14, 2010, after only one successful title defense since July 2009, Hijo del Fantasma lost the Middleweight title to Negro Casas.

In March 2010 signs of dissention amongst the Trios champions began showing as Garza walked out on the team during a trios match mistakenly thinking that one of his teammates had attacked him. Following the walk out Garza kept insincerely insisting that he was still a tecnico and that there was no tension on his team. Further doubts about Garza's allegiance arose when he teamed up with the Rúdo Pólvora to win the 2010 Gran Alternativa tournament. When Garza, La Máscara and Hijo del Fantasma were booked for a CMLL World Trios defense the following week, Garza complained that his partners agreed contesting to the match without asking him, but swore that he would still be professional about it. During the title defense on the May 7, 2010 Super Viernes Garza attacked both Hijo del Fantasma and La Máscara, allowing La Ola Amarilla (Hiroshi Tanahashi, Shigeo Okumura and Taichi Ishikari) to win the CMLL World Trios Championship, turning full blown rudo in the process. On October 28, 2012, Hijo del Fantasma unsuccessfully challenged Dragón Rojo Jr. for the NWA World Historic Middleweight Championship. El Hijo del Fantasma was paired up with rudo El Felino for the 2013 Torneo Nacional de Parejas Increibles ("National Incredible Pairs Tournament"), a tag team tournament teaming rudos with tecnicos. The team lost to La Máscara and Averno in the first round despite Averno and La Máscara being longtime rivals.

Lucha Libre AAA Worldwide (2013–2019)

On October 18, 2013, El Hijo del Fantasma made a surprise jump to Lucha Libre AAA Worldwide (AAA), debuting at the Héroes Inmortales VII event as the newest member of El Consejo, a rudo stable made up of former CMLL wrestlers. In his debut, he made it to the finals of the Copa Antonio Peña, before losing to La Parka. On December 8 at Guerra de Titanes, Fantasma teamed with El Consejo stablemates Silver King and El Texano, Jr. to unsuccessfully challenge Los Psycho Circus (Monster Clown, Murder Clown and Psycho Clown) for the AAA World Trios Championship. On August 17, 2014, at Triplemanía XXII, El Hijo del Fantasma won a ten-way elimination match to unify the AAA Fusión and AAA Cruiserweight Championships, becoming the first AAA World Cruiserweight Champion. On September 20, 2015, Fantasma became the new leader of the La Sociedad stable. On March 19, 2017, El Hijo del Fantasma lost the World Cruiserweight Championship to Johnny Mundo.

On October 1, 2017, at Héroes Inmortales XI, Fantasma won the 2017 Copa Antonio Peña tournament, which meant he also earned the vacant AAA Latin American Championship. He subsequently became involved in a long running storyline with Texano Jr., initially over the Latin American champions, with a steel cage match at Guerra de Titanes that El Hijo del Fantasma won by disqualification. After the match, it was announced that the two would face off in a Luchas de Apuestas at the Rey de Reyes show. On March 4, 2018, at the Rey de Reyes show, El Hijo del Fantasma defeated Texano Jr., forcing the latter to have all his hair shaved off as a result.

In the weeks following Rey de Reyes AAA announced that El Hijo del Fantasma, Psycho Clown, L.A. Park and Pentagón Jr. would all risk their masks in a Poker de Aces match at Triplemanía XXVI.In the build-up to Triplemanía XXVI, El Hijo del Fantasma turned rudo once more, forming a faction known as Los Mercenarios ("The Mercenaries") with Texano Jr., Rey Escorpión, and La Máscara. At Triplemanía XXVI, held on August 26, 2018, L.A. Park defeated El Hijo del Fantasma in the Poker de Aces match. After his loss, El Hijo del Fantasma was forced to unmask and reveal his real name, Jorge Luis Alcantar Bolly, to everyone watching. On December 12, 2018, El Hijo del Fantasma fought Drago in the AAA Latin American Championship. Drago defeated El Hijo del Fantasma to win the Championship in one of the featured matches of Guerra de Titanes.

On March 20, 2019, Fantasma announced his departure from AAA.

Lucha Underground (2014–2019)
In September 2014, Hijo del Fantasma began working for Lucha Underground under the ring name "King Cuerno" (Spanish for "King Antler" or "King Horn"), a "big game" hunter. King Cuerno started a feud with Drago and, on January 21, 2015, King Cuerno defeated Drago in a Last Man Standing match. On February 4, 2015, King Cuerno attacked Johnny Mundo, initiating a feud between them. The rivalry concluded on the March 11, 2015 episode when Mundo and King Cuerno wrestled in a steel cage match, which was won by Mundo. On November 14, 2015, King Cuerno defeated Fénix to win the Gift of the Gods Championship. He lost the title back to Fénix in a ladder match on November 21. At Ultima Lucha Dos, King Cuerno was defeated by Mil Muertes in a deathmatch.

He was not seen in season three of the series until the finale Ultima Lucha Tres, where he attacked Mil Muertes and stole the gauntlet that was contested for by Muertes, Jeremiah Crane and Brian Cage. The storyline started at the end of season 3 and continued into season 4, with King Cuerno and Muertes receiving a double disqualification on September 12, 2018. A week later the feud between King Cuerno and Muertes distracted both wrestlers from their match, allowing Pentagón Dark (previously known as Pentagón Jr.) to successfully defend the Lucha Underground Championship against the two. The rivalry between the two ended inconclusively in a match where Pentagón Dark defeated King Cuerno, Mil Muertes and El Dragon Azeca Jr. on September 26, 2018, which was the last time the two faced off in the Lucha Underground Championship. He was released from his contract on March 26, 2019.

Impact Wrestling (2017–2018)
On July 2, 2017, El Hijo del Fantasma and Drago represented AAA at Impact Wrestling's Slammiversary XV show; the team lost to The Latin American Xchange (Santana and Ortiz), who successfully defended the Impact Wrestling World Tag Team Championship and GFW Tag Team Championship in a match that also included the teams of Laredo Kid with Garza Jr., and Naomichi Marufuji with Taiji Ishimori. At Bound for Glory in 2017, Team AAA (El Hijo del Fantasma, Pagano and Texano) lost to Team Impact (Ethan Carter III, Eddie Edwards and James Storm) in a six-man tag team match. On November 6, 2017, Hijo del Fantasma unsuccessfully challenged Eddie Edwards for the GHC Heavyweight Championship. At Impact Wrestling Redemption, Fantasma competed in a six-way match which was won by Brian Cage.

WWE

Signing and debut (2019–2020)
On August 14, 2019, Alcantar signed a contract with WWE. During one of the first weeks while training at the WWE Performance Center, Alcantar suffered a knee injury that prevented him from wrestling for several months. He made his in-ring debut under his real name for NXT on February 15, 2020, teaming with Raul Mendoza to defeat Lewis Howley and Sam Stoker on a show in Fort Pierce, Florida. On April 12, 2020, Alcantar was announced as a participant in the interim Cruiserweight Title tournament under his El Hijo del Fantasma ring name representing Group B in the tournament. He lost to Isaiah "Swerve" Scott but defeated Jack Gallagher and Akira Tozawa thus making it to the finals.

Legado Del Fantasma (2020–present) 

In the finals Fantasma defeated Drake Maverick to become Cruiserweight Champion for the first time, as well as winning his first championship in WWE. The following week, Fantasma joined forces with the masked men, who had previously attacked him during the tournament and who revealed themselves to be Raul Mendoza and Joaquin Wilde. The group (later named Legado del Fantasma) would attack Maverick, leading to Fantasma unmasking himself and adopting the new ring name of Santos Escobar, establishing himself as a heel in the process. Escobar then began feuding with Isaiah "Swerve" Scott, facing him on the August 26 episode of NXT and NXT TakeOver 31, retaining the title both times. At NXT: Halloween Havoc, Escobar would defeat Jake Atlas in a non-title match. At NXT: New Years Evil, Escobar would defeat Gran Metalik to retain his Cruiserweight Title. Escobar would then face Curt Stallion on the February 3 episode of NXT for the Cruiserweight Title and Escobar would win the match. Escobar would then enter a brief feud with Karrion Kross which came to a head on the February 24 episode of NXT in a no disqualification match in which Escobar would lose.

On March 10, it was announced that Jordan Devlin, the original Cruiserweight Champion, who was unable to defend his title due to the COVID-19 pandemic, would appear on NXT the following week to challenge Santos Escobar, deciding who was the undisputed Cruiserweight Champion in the process. This culminated on April 8, when Escobar defeated Devlin in a ladder match at NXT TakeOver: Stand & Deliver.

On the April 13 episode of NXT, he issued an open challenge, where he lost his title to Kushida, ending his reign at 321 days. After Escobar failed to regain his title from Kushida in a two out of three falls match on the May 11 episode of NXT, he and the other members of Legado del Fantasma would begin feuding with NXT North American Champion, Bronson Reed and NXT Tag Team champions, MSK which would lead to a winners take all six man tag team match at NXT Takeover: In Your House where Legado del Fantasma would be unsuccessful in winning the titles. Shortly after, Escobar would then start feuding with Hit Row and on the August 24 episode of NXT, Legado Del Fantasma would defeat Hit Row in a six man tag team match with the help of a debuting Elektra Lopez. On the October 12 episode of NXT 2.0, Escobar would face Scott for the NXT North American title, but would be unsuccessful. After the match, Carmelo Hayes would cash in his NXT Breakout Tournament opportunity and win the North American title from Scott., In early 2022, Escobar would feud with NXT Champion Bron Breakker unsuccessfully winning the NXT Championship at NXT Vengeance Day despite interference from Dolph Ziggler. At NXT Stand & Deliver, Escobar would fail to win the NXT North American Championship in a ladder match. Shortly after Stand & Deliver, Legado del Fantasma would feud with Tony D'Angelo, the self proclaimed "Don of NXT" and his "family".

At this point, they would slowly turn into faces while portraying heelish tactics. After multiple meetings and kidnappings, Escobar would defeat D'Angelo on the May 17 episode of NXT however at NXT In Your House, Legado del Fantasma lost to the D'Angelo Family (Tony D'Angelo, Stacks and Two Dimes) with the losers having to join the other person's family. With Legado joining the D'Angelo Family, they would accompany each other during matches with them usually losing. On the June 21 episode of NXT, Escobar would cost D'Angelo his title match against NXT North American Champion Carmelo Hayes. At NXT: The Great American Bash, it was revealed that Escobar was hospitalized and the other members of Legado began working with the D'Angelo Family. On the August 2 episode of NXT, Escobar would return and cost D'Angelo and Stacks their title match against The Creed Brothers signaling that their alliance has come to an end. On the August 16 edition of NXT Heatwave, Escobar lost the Street Fight match to D'Angelo, thus banning him from NXT.

On the October 7 episode of SmackDown, Escobar alongside Wilde and Del Toro would join Zelina Vega attacking Hit Row during their entrance, marking the group's main roster debut. At the Royal Rumble on January 28 2023 Escobar entered his first Royal Rumble match at #10 but was eliminated by Brock Lesnar. On the February 10 episode of SmackDown, Escobar competed in a four-way match to determine the number one contender to the WWE Intercontinental Championship, which was won by Madcap Moss. After the match, during an off-air exclusive uploaded to WWE's YouTube channel, Escobar would approach fellow competitor, Rey Mysterio, after the match. Thanking Mysterio for inspiring him as a wrestler and gifting him a mask of his own, Escobar would also receive a mask from Mysterio in return, starting a face turn for Escobar. Following this, Escobar would find himself involved in the feud between Rey and his son Dominik Mysterio, assisting Rey in the feud against Dominik and The Judgment Day as a result, continuing the face turn in the process. On the March 3 episode of SmackDown, Escobar faced Dominik in a match and was defeated following interference from Rhea Ripley, after which Dominik tore up the mask Rey gave to Escobar, solidifying Escobar's face turn.

Films
El Hijo del Fantasma has appeared in the following films:

El Fantasma Vs La Maldición de la Pirámide ("The Phantom Vs The Curse of the Pyramid") (2007)
El Fantasma Vs La Aldea de los Zoombies ("The Phantom Vs The Village of the Zombies") (2007)
El Fantasma Vs El Secreto de la Urna Maldita ("The phantom vs the secret of the cursed urn") (2008)

Personal life

Jorge Luis Alcantar Bolly was born on April 30, 1984, in Mexico City, Mexico. His father was a professional wrestler, known as the enmascarado "El Fantasma". His uncle was also a professional wrestler, known as  Ángel de la Muerte and his cousin has worked under the names Ángel de la Muerte Jr. and then Fantasma Jr. In 2007, it was revealed that Alcantar was a student at Universidad Anahuac, working on a degree in International Relations at that time. Alcantar was accompanied by his son for the Triplemanía XXVI match and was seen in the ring afterward as Alcantar was forced to remove his mask.

Lawsuit against Lucha Underground
On February 6, 2019, it was reported that Alcantar had filed a lawsuit in California against El Rey Network and the production company Baba-G who were behind Lucha Underground. The lawsuit claimed the Lucha Underground contract "Illegally restricted" wrestlers from working in their "lawful profession" by restricting them from working for other companies while under contract with Lucha Underground, which only paid per match. Alcantar's lawyer also revealed that he had filed a class action lawsuit against Lucha Underground over the contracts that he claims are not legal under Californian law. The class action lawsuit also included Ivelisse Vélez, Joey Ryan and Melissa Cervantes looking to invalidate their contracts. The lawsuit led to Alcantar and others being released from their Lucha Underground contracts prior to it expiring.

Championships and accomplishments
Consejo Mundial de Lucha Libre
CMLL World Trios Championship (2 times) – with Héctor Garza and La Mascara
CMLL World Middleweight Championship (1 time)
Torneo Generación 75
CMLL World Trios Championship Tournament (2008) - with Hector Garza and La Mascara
Torneo de Trios (2008) - with El Gallo and Stuka Jr.
Torneo de Parejas (2011) - with Jushin Thunder Liger
CMLL Trio of the year: 2009 (with Héctor Garza and La Máscara)
Lucha Libre AAA Worldwide
AAA Fusión Championship (1 time)
AAA Latin American Championship (1 time)
AAA World Cruiserweight Championship (1 time)
Copa Antonio Peña (2017)
Copa La Polar (2017)
Lucha Underground
Lucha Underground Gift of the Gods Championship (1 time)
Pro Wrestling Illustrated
PWI ranked him #63 of the top 500 singles wrestlers in the PWI 500 in 2015
Toryumon Mexico
Yamaha Cup (2010) – with Angélico
WWE
NXT Cruiserweight Championship (1 time)
Interim NXT Cruiserweight Championship Tournament (2020)

Luchas de Apuestas record

References

External links

 
 
 
 

1984 births
21st-century professional wrestlers
Living people
Mexican male professional wrestlers
Masked wrestlers
Professional wrestlers from Mexico City
NXT/WWE Cruiserweight Champions
AAA Latin American Champions
AAA World Cruiserweight Champions
CMLL World Middleweight Champions
CMLL World Trios Champions
Lucha Underground Gift of the Gods Champions